153rd meridian may refer to:

153rd  meridian east, a line of longitude east of the Greenwich Meridian
153rd meridian west, a line of longitude west of the Greenwich Meridian